The 2015 Louisiana–Lafayette Ragin' Cajuns football team represented the University of Louisiana at Lafayette in the 2015 NCAA Division I FBS football season. They were led by fifth-year head coach Mark Hudspeth and played their home games at Cajun Field in Lafayette, Louisiana. The Ragin' Cajuns were members of the Sun Belt Conference. They finished the season 4–8, 3–5 in Sun Belt play to finish in a five way tie for fifth place.

Previous season
Louisiana-Lafayette went 9–4 last season. However, in 2015, 8 wins, including their bowl victory, were vacated due to massive NCAA violations. The Ragin' Cajuns finished second in the Sun Belt Conference and were awarded the New Orleans Bowl as the conference champion, Georgia Southern were ineligible for post-season play due to their FCS-FBS transition. The defeated the Nevada Wolf Pack 16–3 for their final series of four consecutive bowl appearances and victories.

Preseason

Award watchlists
The following players were named to preseason award watchlist

Walter Camp Award
 Elijah McGuire

Lombardi Award
 Mykhael Quave
 Dominique Tovell

Doak Walker Award
 Elijah McGuire

Paul Hornung Award
 Elijah McGuire

Sun Belt Media Day

Sun Belt Conference Players of the Year

Offensive Player of the Year – Elijah McGuire, RB (Louisiana-Lafayette)

Predicted standings

Preseason All–Conference Team

Offense
QB Fredi Knighten (Arkansas State)
RB Matt Breida (Georgia Southern)
RB Elijah McGuire (Louisiana-Lafayette)
WR J. D. McKissic (Arkansas State)
WR Donovan Harden (Georgia State)
WR Rashon Ceaser (UL Monroe)
TE Joel Ruiz (Georgia State)
OL Jesse Chapman (Appalachian State)
OL Darien Foreman (Georgia Southern)
OL Chris May (South Alabama)
OL Joseph Scelfo (South Alabama)
OL Adrian Bellard (Texas State)

Defense
DL Chris Stone (Arkansas State)
DL Ronald Blair (Appalachian State)
DL Gerrand Johnson (UL Monroe)
DL Javon Rolland-Jones (Arkansas State)
LB John Law (Appalachian State)
LB Xavier Woodson (Arkansas State)
LB Joseph Peterson (Georgia State)
DB Doug Middleton (Appalachian State)
DB Mitch Lane (UL Monroe)
DB David Mims II (Texas State)
DB Montres Kitchens (Troy)

Specialists
PK Aleem Sunanon (South Alabama)
P Austin Rehkow (Idaho)
RS Blaise Taylor (Arkansas State)

Roster

Schedule
Louisiana–Lafayette announced their 2015 football schedule on February 27, 2015. The 2015 schedule consisted of six home and away games in the regular season. The Ragin' Cajuns hosted Sun Belt foes Louisiana–Monroe, New Mexico State, Texas State, and Troy, and traveled to Appalachian State, Arkansas State, Georgia State, and South Alabama.

Schedule source:

Game summaries

Northwestern State

Akron

at Louisiana Tech

Texas State

at Arkansas State

Louisiana–Monroe

at Georgia State

at South Alabama

New Mexico State

at Appalachian State

Troy

References

Louisiana-Lafayette
Louisiana Ragin' Cajuns football seasons
Louisiana-Lafayette Ragin' Cajuns football